Cocker Happy is a "best of" compilation album by English rock/blues singer Joe Cocker, released in Australia, Spain and New Zealand in 1971 on Interfusion Records. It spent 8 weeks at the top of the Australian album charts in 1971.

Track listing

"Hitchcock Railway" (Don Dunn, Tony McCashen)
"She Came in Through the Bathroom Window" (John Lennon, Paul McCartney)
"Marjorine" (Joe Cocker, Frank Myles, Tom Rattigan, Chris Stainton)
"She's So Good to Me" (Cocker, Stainton)
"Hello Little Friend" (Leon Russell)
"With a Little Help from My Friends" (Lennon, McCartney)
"Delta Lady" (Russell)
"Darling Be Home Soon" (John Sebastian)
"Do I Still Figure in Your Life" (Pete Dello)
"Feelin' Alright" (Dave Mason)
"Something's Coming On" (Cocker, Stainton)
"The Letter" (Wayne Carson Thompson)

Personnel 
Joe Cocker – Vocals

Chart positions

References

Joe Cocker compilation albums
1971 compilation albums
Fly Records compilation albums